Kemin is the northeast panhandle district of Chüy Region in northern Kyrgyzstan. Its administrative headquarters is at Kemin. The district is located in the Chong-Kemin Valley, the Kichi-Kemin Valley and the eastern part of the Chüy Valley. It borders with Kazakhstan in the north, Chüy District in the west, and Issyk-Kul Region in the south and east.

Topography
The western part of the district is flat with altitudes 1000–1600 msl, and the eastern part is mountainous.

Climate
The climate is sharply continental with cold winters and cool summers; January temperatures averaging −5 °C to −10 °C, July +17 °C to +18 °C. Average precipitation is from 200 mm in flatlands, and up to 600–700 mm in mountains.

Hydrology
Large rivers in the district include the Chu, Chong-Kemin, Kichi-Kemin and others. There are also several small lakes: Chong-Kelter, Chelek and Kosh-Kel

Demographics
The population of Kemin District, according to the Population and Housing Census of 2009, was 44,118 which is second lowest among districts of the Chüy Region. Average density is 12 people per square kilometer. Some 36% of population lives in urban areas, and 64% in rural ones.

Ethnic composition
According to the 2009 Census, the ethnic composition (de jure population) of the Kemin District was:

Populated places
In total, Kemin District include 2 towns, 1 urban-type settlement and 34 settlements in 11 rural communities. Each rural community can consist of one or several villages. The towns, urban-type settlements, rural communities and villages in the Kemin District are:

town Orlovka
town Kemin
urban-type settlement Bordu
Ak-Tüz (seat: Ak-Tüz)
Almaluu (seat: Kyzyl-Suu; incl. Almaluu and Bordu)
Boroldoy (seat: Boroldoy)
Chong-Kemin (seat: Shabdan; incl. Kalmak-Ashuu, Kyzyl-Bayrak, Tar-Suu and Törtkül)
Chym-Korgon (seat: Chym-Korgon; incl. Novomikhaylovka and Samansur)
Duysheev (seat: Kichi-Kemin)
Ilyich (seat: Ilyich; incl. Jangy-Jol and Jol-Bulak (Sovetskoye))
Jangy-Alysh (seat: Jangy-Alysh)
Kara-Bulak (seat: Kara-Bulak; incl. Altymysh, Beysheke and Chüy)
Kök-Oyrok (seat: Kayyngdy; incl. Korool-Döbö and Tegirmenti)
Kyzyl-Oktyabr (seat: Kyzyl-Oktyabr; incl. Ak-Beket, Jel-Aryk, Dorozhnoye, Kashkeleng, Kyz-Kyya, Sasyk-Bulak, Udarnik and Cholok)

References 

Districts of Chüy Region